Bùi La Nhân is a rural commune of Đức Thọ District, Hà Tĩnh Province, Vietnam.

References

Populated places in Hà Tĩnh province
Communes of Hà Tĩnh province